Egbert Jan Groenink is a former Dutch politician who was a member of the House of Representatives for the Pim Fortuyn List.

Groenink was elected to the House of Representatives in the 2002 Dutch general election. He was originally placed 29 on the LPF list but gained his seat due to the murder of Fortuyn and other LPF MPs not taking their seats. In parliament, he was a member of the Srebrenica massacre Parliamentary Committee of Inquiry. He was not reelected in 2003.

References 

1965 births
Members of the House of Representatives (Netherlands)
Pim Fortuyn List politicians
21st-century Dutch politicians

Living people
Politicians from Meppel